Arattupuzha is a cultural village in Thrissur district of Kerala in South India

 South India, approximately  South of the town of Thrissur.

Located on the banks of the Karuvannur river, Arattupuzha is home to the annual Arattupuzha Pooram that stages the grand spectacle of numerous caparisoned elephants lined up in a row to the accompaniment of ethnic percussion concerts. Firework displays are also part of the celebration. The Arattupuzha Sastha Temple is located in Arattupuzha. The temple dates back 3000 years.

References 

Villages in Thrissur district